Sai Wan Estate is a public housing estate in Kennedy Town, Sai Wan, Hong Kong. Built in 1958 and 1959, it sits in a hillside that had to be extensively cut away for its construction. The estate comprises 640 flats in five linear blocks of 10 to 14 storeys. It is the only public housing estate in Central and Western District developed by the Hong Kong Housing Authority and it is the second oldest existing public housing estate built by the Hong Kong Housing Authority, after Model Housing Estate.

Sai Wan Estate was designed by government architect Stanley Feltham.

Despite its age, in 2008 the Housing Authority decided not to redevelop the estate in the short term. Instead, repair works were planned to be carried out in the buildings to sustain the estate for the following 15 years.

Houses

Politics
Sai Wan Estate is located in Kennedy Town & Mount Davis constituency of the Central and Western District Council. It was formerly represented by Cherry Wong Kin-ching, who was elected in the 2019 elections until June 2021.

See also
 Kwun Lung Lau
 Public housing in Hong Kong
 List of public housing estates in Hong Kong

References

External links

 西環邨 

Kennedy Town
Public housing estates in Hong Kong
Residential buildings completed in 1958
Residential buildings completed in 1959